Puerto Viejo (Spanish for "Old Port" or "Old Harbor") can refer to two towns in Costa Rica:

Puerto Viejo de Talamanca 
Puerto Viejo de Sarapiquí